Joe Michael Foley (born August 12, 1955) is an American women's basketball coach. He has coached the Little Rock Trojans women's basketball team since 2003. He coached from 1987–2003 at Arkansas Tech.

Career
Since Foley was brought on as head coach, Little Rock has won the West Division in the Sun Belt in 2008, 2009, 2010, and 2013. They won the Sun Belt Conference Tournament in 2011, 2012, and 2015. They have made the WNIT in 2008, 2009, and 2013. They made the Second Round of the NCAA Tournament in 2010 beating Georgia Tech 63–53. They lost to Oklahoma 60–44 in the subsequent game. They made the Second Round in 2015 after beating Texas A&M 69–60. They lost 57–54 to Arizona State in the subsequent game.

Before he came to Little Rock, Foley coached the Arkansas Tech Golden Suns for 17 seasons, from 1987 to 2003. In that time, Foley lead the Golden Suns to 11 conference championships, 14 appearances in the NAIA and NCAA Division II women's basketball tournaments, 6 appearances in the NAIA  and NCAA Division II Women's Final Four, and back-to-back NAIA national championships in 1992 and 1993. Arkansas Tech moved up in classification from NAIA to NCAA Division II beginning in the 1995–96 school year. Foley's 1999 team finished as the NCAA Division II national runners-up. 
Six of Foley's teams won 30 games or more, and he coached 12 players that were recognized as All-Americans. Over those seventeen seasons, Foley compiled a record of 456–81 overall, 216–28 in conference play. He holds the record for most wins by a basketball coach in Arkansas Tech history.

Head coaching record

See also
 List of college women's basketball coaches with 600 wins

References

1955 births
Living people
Little Rock Trojans women's basketball coaches
People from Boone County, Arkansas
Basketball coaches from Arkansas